Amii Anne J. Grove, (born 5 September 1985), is an English former glamour model and Page 3 girl. She has appeared in publications such as The Sun, Nuts, Zoo Weekly, FHM and the Hot Shots Calendar.

Life and career
Grove was born in Solihull. In 2004, she competed for the title of Miss Bikini World but failed to place, she also competed in Miss England later that year, but again failed to win the title. In 2007, she was listed at position 66 in [[FHM's 100 Sexiest Women (UK)|FHM'''s 100 Sexiest Women in the World]].

TV appearances
In 2007, Grove appeared on BBC Two game show The Weakest Link. In 2009, she was interviewed during a topless shoot by Kirsten O'Brien for a documentary entitled Kirsten O'Brien's Topless Ambition. In 2010, she appeared on UK morning show Breakfast.

Acting career
In 2010, Grove appeared as "Amii" in the Steven Lawson horror film Dead Cert, and as "Jenny" in the Steven Lawson comedy film Just for the Record. In 2011, she was cast as a "Forest Woman" in the James Franco fantasy film Your Highness''.

Personal life
Grove was previously engaged to footballer Jermaine Pennant. In 2007 Pennant was issued with a Fixed Penalty Notice following a row with Grove at the couple's home in Hale Village.

See also

 Lad culture
 Lad mags

References

External links
 
 Amii Grove at mandatory.com

1985 births
Association footballers' wives and girlfriends
Glamour models
Living people
Page 3 girls
People from Solihull